The Mazda RX-7 is a front-engine, rear-wheel-drive, rotary engine-powered sports car that was manufactured and marketed by Mazda from 1978 until 2002 across three generations, all of which made use of a compact, lightweight Wankel rotary engine.

The first generation of the RX-7, SA (early) and FB (late), was a two-seater 2 door hatchback coupé. It featured a 12A carbureted rotary engine as well as the option for a 13B with electronic fuel injection in later years.

The second generation of RX-7, known as the FC, was offered as a 2-seater coupé with a 2+2 option available in some markets, as well as in a convertible bodystyle. This was powered by the 13B rotary engine, offered in naturally aspirated or turbocharged forms.

The third generation of the RX-7, known as the FD, was offered a 2+2-seater coupé with a limited run of a 2-seater option. This featured a sequentially turbocharged 13B REW engine.

More than 800,000 were manufactured over its lifetime.



First generation (SA22C, FB)

Series 1 (1978-1980)
Series 1 (produced from 1978 until 1980) is commonly referred to as the "SA22C" from the first alphanumerics of the vehicle identification number. Mazda's internal project number for what was to become the RX-7 was X605. In Japan it was introduced in March 1978, replacing the Savanna RX-3, and joined Mazda's only other remaining rotary engine-powered products, called the Cosmo which was a two-door luxury coupé, and the Luce luxury sedan.

The transition of the Savanna to a sports car appearance reflected products from other Japanese manufacturers. The advantage the RX-7 had was its minimal size and weight, and the compact rotary engine installed behind the front axle helped balance the front and rear weight distribution, which provided a low center of gravity.

In Japan, sales were enhanced by the fact that the RX-7 complied with the Japanese Government dimension regulations: thus Japanese buyers were not liable for yearly taxes for driving a larger car. The rotary engine had financial advantages to Japanese consumers in that the engine displacement remained below , a significant determination when paying the Japanese annual road tax; this kept the obligation affordable to most buyers while having more power than the traditional engines having a straight cylinder configuration.

In May 1980, Mazda introduced a limited production run of special North American models known as the Leathersport Models. This package was essentially an uprated GS model with added LS badges on each B-pillar, special stripes on the exterior, and LS-only gold anodized wheels (with polished outer face and wheel rim). All LS editions came equipped with special LS-only full brown leather upholstery, leather-wrapped steering wheel, leather-wrapped shift knob, removable sunroof, LS-specific four-speaker AM/FM stereo radio with power antenna (though listed as a six-speaker stereo, as the two rear dual voice coil speakers were counted as four speakers in total), remote power door side mirrors, and other standard GS equipment. Two primary options were also available; a three-speed JATCO 3N71B automatic transmission and air conditioning. Other GS options such as cassette tape deck, splash guards, padded center console arm rest and others could be added by the dealer. The LS model was only ever available in three different exterior colors: Aurora White, Brilliant Black, and Solar Gold. No official production records are known to exist or to have been released. This series of RX-7 had exposed steel bumpers and a high-mounted indentation-located rear license plate, called by Werner Buhrer of Road & Track magazine a "Baroque depression."

Series 2 (1981-1983)

The Series 2, referred to as the FB (produced from 1981 to 1983), had integrated plastic-covered bumpers, wide black rubber body side moldings, wraparound taillights and updated engine control components. While marginally longer overall, the new model was  lighter in federalized trim. The four-speed manual option was dropped for 1981 as well, while the gas tank grew larger and the dashboard was redesigned, including a shorter gear stick mounted closer to the driver. In 1983, the  speedometer returned for the RX-7. The GSL package provided optional four-wheel disc brakes, front ventilated (Australian model) and clutch-type rear limited-slip differential (LSD). This revision of the SA22 was known in North America as the "FB" after the US Department of Transportation mandated 17 digit Vehicle Identification Number changeover. For various other markets worldwide, the 1981–1985 RX-7 retained the 'SA22C' VIN prefix. In the UK, the 1978–1980 series 1 cars carried the SA code on the VIN but all later cars (1981–1983 series 2 and 1984–1985 series 3) carried the FB code and these first-generation RX-7s are known as the "FB" only in Northern America. 

In Japan, a very well appointed version similar to the export market GSL arrived late in 1982, called the SE-Limited. This model received two-tone paint, alloy wheels shaped like the Wankel rotor, all-wheel disc brakes, limited-slip differential, and a full leather interior.

European market cars also received four-wheel disc brakes as standard.

Series 3 (1984-1985)

The Series 3 (produced 1984–1985) featured an updated lower front fascia. North American models received a different instrument cluster. GSL package was continued into this series, but Mazda introduced the GSL-SE sub-model. GSL-SE models had much the same options as the GSL (clutch-type rear LSD and rear disc brakes), but the brake rotors were larger, allowing Mazda to use the more common lug nuts (versus bolts), and a new bolt pattern of 4x114.3mm (4x4.5"). Also, they had upgraded suspension with stiffer springs and shocks. The external oil cooler was reintroduced, after being dropped in the 1983 model-year for the controversial "beehive" water-oil heat exchanger.

The 1984 RX-7 GSL has an estimated 29 MPG (8.11 litres/100 km) highway/19 MPG (12.37 L/100 km) city. According to Mazda, its rotary engine, licensed by NSU-Wankel allowed the RX-7 GSL to accelerate from 0 to 80  km/h (50  mph) in 6.3 seconds.

In 1985, Mazda introduced the RX-7 Finale in Australia. This was the last of the series and brought out in limited numbers. The Finale featured power options and a brass plaque mentioning the number the car was as well as "Last of a legend" on the plaque. The finale had special stickers and a blacked out section between the window & rear hatch.

The handling and acceleration of the car were noted to be of a high caliber for its day. The RX-7 had "live axle" 4-link rear suspension with Watt's linkage, a 50:50 front and rear weight distribution, and weighed under . It was the lightest generation of the RX-7 ever produced. 12A-powered models accelerated from 0–97 km/h (60 mph) in 9.2 seconds, and turned 0.779 g (7.64 m/s²) laterally on a skidpad. Because of the smoothness inherent in the Wankel rotary engine, little vibration or harshness was experienced at high engine speeds, so a buzzer was fitted to the tachometer to warn the driver when the 7,000 rpm redline was approaching.

The 12A engine has a long thin shaped combustion chamber, having a large surface area in relation to its volume. Therefore, combustion is cool, giving few oxides of nitrogen. However, the combustion is also incomplete, so there are large amounts of partly burned hydrocarbons and carbon monoxide. The exhaust is hot enough for combustion of these to continue into the exhaust. An engine-driven pump supplies air into the exhaust to complete the burn of these chemicals. This is done in the "thermal reactor" chamber where the exhaust manifold would normally be on a conventional engine. Under certain conditions, the pump injects air into the thermal reactor and at other times air is pumped through injectors into the exhaust ports. This fresh air is needed for more efficient and cleaner-burning of the air/fuel mixture.

Options and models varied from country to country. The gauge layout and interior styling in the Series 3 was only changed for the North American models. Additionally, North America was the only market to have offered the first generation of the RX-7 with the fuel-injected 13B, model GSL-SE. Sales of the first-generation RX-7 were strong, with a total of 474,565 cars produced; 377,878 (nearly eighty percent) were sold in the United States alone.

RX-7 Turbo

Following the introduction of the first turbocharged rotary engine in the Luce/Cosmo, a similar, also fuel injected and non-intercooled 12A turbocharged engine was made available for the top-end model of the Series 3 RX-7 in Japan. It was introduced in September 1983. While the peak power figures were only slightly higher than those of the engine used in the Luce/Cosmo, the new "Impact Turbo" was developed specifically to deal with the different exhaust gas characteristics of a rotary engine. Both rotor vanes of the turbine were remodeled and made smaller, and the turbine had a twenty percent higher speed than a turbo intended for a conventional engine. The Savanna Turbo was short-lived, as the next generation of the RX-7 was about to be introduced.

Second generation (FC3S and FC3C) 

The second generation of the RX-7 ("FC", VIN begins JM1FC3 or JMZFC1), still known as the Mazda Savanna RX-7 in Japan, featured a complete restyling much like similar sports cars of the era such as the Nissan 300ZX. Mazda's development team, led by Chief Project Engineer , chose to focus on the American market when designing the FC, where the majority of first-generation of the RX-7 models had been sold. The team drew inspiration from successful sports cars that were popular at the time, such as studying the suspension design of the Porsche 928.

While the SA22 was a purer sports car, the FC tended toward the softer sport-tourer trends of its day, sharing some similarities with the HB series Cosmo. Handling was much improved, with less of the oversteer tendencies of the SA22. The rear end design was vastly improved from the SA22's live rear axle to a more modern, Independent Rear Suspension (rear axle). Steering was more precise, with rack and pinion steering replacing the old recirculating-ball steering of the SA22. Disc brakes also became standard, with some models (S4: Sport, GXL, GTU, Turbo II, Convertible; S5: GXL, GTUs, Turbo, Convertible) offering four-piston front brakes. The rear seats were optional in some models of the FC RX-7, but are not commonly found in the American Market. Mazda also introduced Dynamic Tracking Suspension System (DTSS) in the FC. The revised independent rear suspension incorporated special toe control hubs which were capable of introducing a limited degree of passive rear steering under cornering loads. The DTSS worked by allowing a slight amount of toe-out under normal driving conditions but induced slight toe-in under heavier cornering loads at around 0.5g or more; toe-out in the rear allows for a more responsive rotation of the rear, but toe-in allowed for a more stable rear under heavier cornering. Another new feature was the Auto Adjusting Suspension (AAS). The system changed damping characteristics according to the road and driving conditions. The system compensated for camber changes and provided anti-dive and anti-squat effects.

In Japan, a limited edition of the FC called Infini was available with production limited to only 600 cars for each year. Some special noted features for all Infini series are: infini logo on the rear, upgraded suspension, upgraded ECU, higher power output of the engine, lightened weight, 15-inch BBS aluminum alloy wheels, Infini logo steering wheel, aero bumper kits, bronze colored window glass, floor bar on the passenger side, aluminum bonnet with scoop, flare, and holder. The car was thought as the pinnacle of the RX-7 series (until the introduction of the FD). The Infini IV came with other special items such as black bucket seats, 16-inch BBS wheels, Knee pads, and all the other items mentioned before. There are differing years for the Infini, which denoted the series. Series I was introduced in 1987, Series II was introduced in 1988, Series III was introduced in 1989, and Series IV was introduced in 1990. Series I and II came in White or Black exterior colours, Series III came in Shade Green only, and Series IV came in Shade Green or Noble Green exterior colours. There are only minor differences between the Series models, the biggest change which was from the Series I and II being an S4 and the Series III and IV being an S5.

The Turbo II model uses a turbocharger with a twin scroll design. The smaller primary chamber is engineered to cancel the turbo lag at low engine speeds. At higher revolutions, the secondary chamber is opened, pumping out 33 percent more power than the naturally aspirated counterpart. The Turbo II also has an air-to-air intercooler which has a dedicated intake on the hood. The intake is slightly offset toward the left side of the hood. In the Japanese market, only the turbocharged engine was available; the naturally-aspirated version was only available for select export markets. This can be attributed to insurance companies in many Western nations penalising turbocharged cars (thus restricting potential sales). The limited edition, two-seater Infini model received a  version beginning in June 1990, thanks to an upgraded exhaust system and high-octane fuel.

Australian Motors Mazda introduced a limited run of 250 'Sports' model Series 4 RX-7s; each with no power steering, power windows or rear wiper as an attempt to reduce the weight of the car.

Convertible

Mazda introduced a convertible version of the RX-7, the FC3C, in 1988 with a naturally aspirated engine—introduced to the US market with ads featuring actor James Garner, at the time featured in many Mazda television advertisements. Only about 22,000 convertibles were built making them quite rare.

The convertible featured a removable rigid section over the passengers and a folding fabric rear section with heatable rear glass window. Power operated, lowering the top required unlatching two header catches, power lowering the top, exiting the car (or reaching over to the right side latch), and folding down the rigid section manually. Mazda introduced with the convertible the first integral windblocker, a rigid panel that folded up from behind the passenger seats to block unwanted drafts from reaching the passengers—thereby extending the driving season for the car with the top retracted. The convertible also featured optional headrest mounted audio speakers and a folding leather snap-fastened tonneau cover. The convertible assembly was precisely engineered and manufactured, and dropped into the ready body assembly as a complete unit—a first in convertible production.

Production ceased in 1991 after Mazda marketed a limited run of 500 examples for 1992 for the domestic market only. In markets outside the US, only the turbocharged version of the convertible was available.

North America
The Series 4 (produced for the 1986 through the 1988 model years) was available with a naturally aspirated, fuel injected 13B-VDEI producing  in North American spec. The turbo model was introduced at the Chicago Auto Show in February 1986, with a target of 20 percent of overall RX-7 sales. 

The Series 5 (1989–1992) featured updated styling and better engine management, as well as lighter rotors and a higher compression ratio 9.7:1 for the naturally aspirated model, and 9.0:1 for the turbo model.

Mazda sold 86,000 RX-7s in the US alone in 1986, its first model year, with sales peaking in 1988.

10th Anniversary RX-7
Mazda introduced the 10th Anniversary RX-7 in 1988 as a limited production model based on the RX-7 Turbo II. Production was limited to 1,500 units. The 10th Anniversary RX-7 features a Crystal White (paint code UC) monochromatic paint scheme with matching white body side mouldings, tail light housings, mirrors and 16-inch alloy seven-spoke wheels. There were two "series" of 10th Anniversary models, with essentially a VIN-split running production change between the two. The most notable difference between the series can be found on the exterior- the earlier "Series I" cars had a black "Mazda" logo decal on the front bumper cover, whereas most if not all "Series II" cars did not have the decal. Series II cars also received the lower seat cushion height/tilt feature that Series I cars lacked. Another distinctive exterior feature is the bright gold rotor-shaped 10th Anniversary Edition badge on the front fenders (yellow-gold on the Series II cars). A distinctive 10th Anniversary package feature is the all black leather interior (code D7), which included not just the seats, but the door panel inserts as well and a leather-wrapped MOMO steering wheel (with 10th Anniversary Edition embossed horn button) and MOMO leather shift knob with integrated boot. All exterior glass is bronze tinted (specific in North America to only the 10th Anniversary), and the windshield was equipped with the embedded secondary antenna also found on some other select models with the upgraded stereo packages. Other 10th Anniversary Edition specific items were headlight washers (the only RX-7 in the US market that got this feature), glass breakage detectors added to the factory alarm system, 10th Anniversary Edition logoed floor mats, 10th Anniversary Edition embroidered front hood protector and accompanying front end mask (or "bra"), and an aluminum under pan.

GTUs (1989–1990)
In 1989, with the introduction of the facelifted FC RX-7, and to commemorate the RX-7s IMSA domination, Mazda introduced a limited model labeled the GTUs. Starting with the lightweight base model, which came with manual windows, no rear wiper, the sunroof and A/C was dealer optioned, the GTUs added items found on the Turbo model such as four-piston front brakes, ventilated rear brake rotors, vehicle speed-sensing power steering, one-piece front chin spoiler, cloth-covered Turbo model seats, leather-wrapped steering wheel, 16-inch wheels, 205/55VR tyres, and a GTUs-only 4.300 viscous-type limited-slip differential (all other FC LSD's were 4.100). This allowed quicker acceleration from the naturally aspirated 13B. It was rumoured that Mazda built 100 cars in 1989–1990. There have not been 100 of these models found and registered. The only way to verify the GTUs model is through the door ID tag and firewall VIN. It is the only model with turbo ID tags and a non turbo VIN.

Third generation (FD3S) 

The third generation RX-7, FD (chassis code FD3S for Japan and JM1FD for the North America), featured an updated body design.

Another key designer was Wu-huang Chin, a Taiwanese automotive artist who also worked on the Mazda MX-5 Miata.

In Japan, sales were affected by this series' non-compliance with Japanese dimension regulations and Japanese buyers paid annual taxes for the car's non-compliant width. As the RX-7 was now considered an upper-level luxury sports car due to the increased width dimensions, Mazda also offered two smaller offerings, the Eunos Roadster, and the Eunos Presso hatchback.

The sequential twin turbocharging system, introduced in 1992, was extremely complex and was developed with the aid of Hitachi. It was previously used on the exclusive-to-Japan Cosmo JC Series. The system used two turbochargers, one to provide  of boost from 1,800 rpm. The second turbocharger activated in the upper half of the rpm range, during full throttle acceleration — at 4,000 rpm to maintain  until redline.

Under high speed driving conditions, the changeover process produced a significant increase in power output and forced technical drivers to adjust their driving style to anticipate and mitigate any over-steer during cornering. The standard turbo control system used 4 control solenoids, 4 actuators, both a vacuum and pressure chamber, and several feet of preformed vacuum/pressure hoses, all of which were prone to failure in part due to complexity and the inherent high temperatures of the rotary engine.

A special high-performance version of the RX-7 was introduced in Australia in 1995, named the RX-7 SP. This model was developed to achieve homologation for racing in the Australian GT Production Car Series and the Eastern Creek 12 Hour production car race. An initial run of 25 cars were made, and later an extra 10 were built by Mazda due to demand. Other changes included a race-developed carbon fibre nose cone and rear spoiler, a carbon fibre  fuel tank (as opposed to the  tank in the standard car), a 4.3:1 final drive ratio, 17-inch wheels, larger brake rotors and calipers. A "three times more efficient" intercooler, a new exhaust, and a modified ECU were also included. The formula paid off when the RX-7 SP won the 1995 Eastern Creek 12 Hour, giving Mazda the winning 12 hour trophy for a fourth straight year. The winning car also gained a podium finish at the international tarmac rally Targa Tasmania months later. A later special version, the Bathurst R, was introduced in 2001 to commemorate this victory in Japan only. It was based on the RX-7 Type R and 500 were built in total, featuring adjustable dampers, a carbon fibre shift knob, carbon fibre interior trim, special fog lamps and a different parking brake lever.

In the United Kingdom, for 1992, customers were offered only one version of the FD, which was based on a combination of the US touring and the base model. For the following year, in a bid to speed up sales, Mazda reduced the price of the RX-7 to £25,000, down from £32,000, and refunded the difference to those who bought the car before that was announced. From 1992 to 1995, only 210 FD RX-7s were officially sold in the UK. The FD continued to be imported to the UK until 1996. In 1998, for a car that had suffered from slow sales when it was officially sold, with a surge of interest and the benefit of a newly introduced SVA scheme, the FD would become so popular that there were more parallel and grey imported models brought into the country than Mazda UK had ever imported.

Information about various trims and models is listed as follows:

Series 6 (1992-1995)
Series 6 was exported throughout the world and had the highest sales. In Japan, Mazda sold the RX-7 through its ɛ̃fini brand as the ɛ̃fini RX-7. Models in Japan included the Type S, the base model, Type R, the lightweight sports model, Type RZ, Type RB, A-spec and the Touring X, which came with a four-speed automatic transmission. The RX-7 was sold in 1993–1995 in the U.S. and Canada.

North American market
At launch, three option packages were offered; the "base", the Touring and the R1 (renamed R2 in 1994). A 5-speed manual transmission was standard and a 4-speed automatic was available on the base model and Touring package. The Touring package included a glass moonroof, fog lights, leather seats, a rear window wiper and a Bose Acoustic Wave music system with CD player. The R1 (R2 in 1994–95) model featured upgraded springs, Bilstein shocks, an additional engine oil cooler, an aerodynamics package comprising a front lip and rear wing, suede seats and Pirelli Z-rated tires . The R2 differed from the R1 in that it had slightly softer suspension. 

In 1994, the interior received a small update to include a passenger-side air bag, and a PEG (popular equipment group) package was offered. The PEG package featured leather seats, a rear cargo cover and a power steel sunroof. It did not include the fog lights or Bose stereo of the touring package. 

In 1995, the Touring package was replaced by the PEP (popular equipment package). The PEP package contained a rear wing, leather seats, sunroof and fog lights, but didn't have the Bose Stereo nor the rear window wiper. An estimated 500 RX7s were produced for the 1995 model year. This would be the final year of RX7 production for North America.

European market
In Europe, only 1,152 examples of the FD were sold through the official Mazda network, due to a high price and a fairly short time span. Only one model was available and it included twin oil-coolers, electric sunroof, cruise control and the rear storage bins in place of the back seats. It also has the stiffer suspension and strut braces from the R models. Germany topped the sales with 446 cars, while UK is second at 210 and Greece third with 168 (thanks to that country's tax structure which favored the rotary engine). The European models also received the 1994 interior facelift, with a passenger air bag. Sales in most of Europe ended after 1995 as it would have been too expensive to reengineer the car to meet the new Euro 2 emissions regulations.

Series 7 (1996-1998)
Series 7 included minor changes to the car. Updates included a simplified vacuum routing manifold and a 16-bit ECU which combined with an improved intake system netted an extra . This additional horsepower was only available on manual transmission cars as the increase in power was only seen above 7,000 rpm, which was the redline for automatic transmission equipped cars. The rear spoiler and tail lights were also redesigned. The Type RZ model was now equipped with larger brake rotors as well as 17-inch BBS wheels. In Japan, the Series 7 RX-7 was marketed under the Mazda and ɛ̃fini brand name. The Series 7 was also sold in Australia, New Zealand and the UK. Series 7 RX-7s were produced only in right-hand-drive configuration.

Series 8 (1998-2002)
Series 8 was the final series, and was only available in the Japanese market. More efficient turbochargers were available on certain models, while improved intercooling and radiator cooling was made possible by a redesigned front fascia with larger openings. The seats, steering wheel, and instrument cluster were all changed. The rear spoiler was modified and gained adjustability on certain models. Three horsepower levels are available:  for automatic transmission equipped cars, for the Type RB, and  available on the top-of-the-line sporting models.

The Type RS version also sported a 4.30 final drive ratio, providing a significant reduction in its 0– time. The gearbox was also modified, 5th gear was made longer to reduce cruising rpm and improve fuel efficiency. It also featured gun-metal colored BBS wheels and a red racing themed interior. An improved ABS system worked by braking differently on each wheel, allowing the car better turning during braking. The effective result made for safer driving for the average buyer.

Easily the most collectible of all the RX-7s was the last model limited to 1,500 units. Dubbed the "Spirit R", they combined all the extra features Mazda had used on previous limited-run specials with new exclusive features like cross-drilled brake rotors. Sticker prices when new were 3,998,000 yen for Type-A and B and 3,398,000 yen for Type-C. Mazda's press release said "The Type-A Spirit R model is the ultimate RX-7, boasting the most outstanding driving performance in its history."

There are three models of "Spirit R": the "Type A", "Type B", and "Type C". The "Type A" is a two-seater with a 5-speed manual transmission. It features lightweight red trim Recaro front seats as seen in the earlier RZ models. The "Type B" shares all features of the "Type A" but with a 2+2 seat configuration. The "Type C" is also a 2+2, but has a four-speed automatic transmission. Of the 1504 Spirit R's made, 1044 were Type A, 420 Type B and 40 Type C. An exclusive Spirit R paint color, Titanium Grey, adorned 719 of the 1504 cars produced.

In Japan the FD3S production span is categorized into 6 models: #1 from 1991/12, #2 from 1993/08, #3 from 1995/03, #4 from 1996/01, #5 from 1998/12 and #6 from 2000/10. The model number (1 to 6) actually shows as the first digit of the 6 digits long JDM VIN, for example in VIN# FD3S-ABCDEF the A is the model number. A total of 9 limited editions (type RZ in 1992/10 (300 cars), RZ 1993/10 (150), R-II Bathurst 1994/09 (350), R Bathurst X 1995/07 (777), RB Bathurst X 1997/01 (700), RS-R 1997/10 (500), RZ 2000/10 (325), R Bathurst R 2001/08 (650), Spirit R 2002/04 (1504)) and 2 special editions (Bathurst R 1995/02, R Bathurst 2001/12 (2174)) were produced.

Reviews and awards
The RX-7 made Car and Driver magazine's Ten Best list five times.

In 2004, Sports Car International named the Series 3 car seventh on their list of Top Sports Cars of the 1970s. In 1983, the RX-7 would appear on Car and Driver magazine's Ten Best list for the first time in 20 years.

Though about  heavier and more isolated than its predecessor, the FC continued to win accolades from the press. The FC RX-7 was Motor Trends Import Car of the Year for 1986, and the Turbo II was on Car and Driver magazine's 10Best list for a second time in 1987.

The FD RX-7 was Motor Trend's Import Car of the Year. When Playboy first reviewed the FD RX-7 in 1993, they tested it in the same issue as the [then] new Dodge Viper. In that issue, Playboy declared the RX-7 to be the better of the two cars. It went on to win Playboy's Car of the Year for 1993. The FD RX-7 also made Car and Driver's Ten Best list for 1993 through 1995, for every year in which it was sold state-side. June 2007 Road & Track proclaimed "The ace in Mazda's sleeve is the RX-7, a car once touted as the purest, most exhilarating sports car in the world." After its introduction in 1991, it won the Automotive Researchers' and Journalists' Conference Car of the Year award in Japan.

Handling in the FD was regarded as world-class, and it is still regarded as being one of the finest-handling and the best-balanced cars of all time.

Motorsport

Racing versions of the first-generation RX-7 were entered at the prestigious 24 hours of Le Mans endurance race. The first outing for the car, equipped with a 13B engine, failed by less than one second to qualify in 1979. The next year, a 12A-equipped RX-7 not only qualified, it placed 21st overall. That same car did not finish in 1981, along with two more 13B cars. Those two cars were back for 1982, with one 14th-place finish and another DNF. The RX-7 Le Mans effort was replaced by the 717C prototype for 1983.

Mazda began racing RX-7s in the IMSA GTU series in 1979. In its first year, RX-7s placed first and second at the 24 Hours of Daytona, and claimed the GTU series championship. The car continued winning, claiming the GTU championship seven years in a row. The RX-7 took the GTO championship ten years in a row from 1982. In addition to this, a GTX version was developed, named the Mazda RX-7 GTP; this was unsuccessful, and the GTP version of the car was also unsuccessful. The RX-7 has won more IMSA races than any other car model. In the USA SCCA competition RX-7s were raced with great success by Don Kearney in the NE Division and John Finger in the SE Division. Pettit Racing won the GT2 Road Racing Championship in 1998. The car was a '93 Mazda RX-7 street car with only bolt-on accessories. At season end Pettit had 140 points—63 points more than the second place team. This same car finished the Daytona Rolex 24-hour race four times.

The RX-7 also fared well at the Spa 24 Hours race. Three Savanna/RX-7s were entered in 1981 by Tom Walkinshaw Racing. After hours of battling with several BMW 530is and Ford Capris, the RX-7 driven by Pierre Dieudonné and Tom Walkinshaw won the event. Mazda had turned the tables on BMW, who had beaten Mazda's Familia Rotary to the podium eleven years earlier at the same event. TWR's prepared RX-7s also won the British Touring Car Championship in 1980 and 1981, driven by Win Percy.

Canadian born Australian touring car driver Allan Moffat was instrumental in bringing Mazda into the Australian touring car scene which ran to Group C regulations unique to Australia. Over a four-year span beginning in 1981, Moffat took the Mazda RX-7 to victory in the 1983 Australian Touring Car Championship, as well as a trio of Bathurst 1000 podiums, in 1981 (3rd with Derek Bell), 1983 (second with Yoshimi Katayama) and 1984 (third with former motorcycle champion Gregg Hansford). Privateer racer Peter McLeod drove his RX-7 to win the 1983 Australian Endurance Championship, while Moffat won the Endurance title in 1982 and 1984. Australia's adoption of international Group A regulations, combined with Mazda's reluctance to homologate a Group A RX-7 (meaning that a base number of 5,000 had to be built, plus another 500 "evolution" models), ended Mazda's active participation in Australian touring car racing at the end of the 1984 season. Plans had been in place to replace the RX-7 with a Mazda 929, but testing by Allan Moffat in late 1984 had indicated that the car would be uncompetitive and Mazda abandoned plans to race in Group A.

The RX-7 even made an appearance in the World Rally Championship. The car finished 11th on its debut at the RAC Rally in Wales in 1981. Group B received much of the focus for the first part of the 1980s, but Mazda did manage to place third at the 1985 Acropolis Rally, and when the Group B was folded, its Group A-based replacement, the 323 4WD claimed the victory at Swedish Rally in both 1987 and 1989.

IMSA Bridgestone Supercar Series

The third generation Mazda RX7 entered its first professional race in the world on February 23, 1992, at the Miami Grand Prix. The cars made it to the podium many times and won the IMSA Supercar race at Sebring in 1994. Peter Farrell Motorsport also fielded RX7's in the IMSA Firestone Firehawk Endurance Series dominating many races and finishing runner up in the overall Championship two years in a row.

Revivals
Mazda has made several references to a revival of the RX-7 in various forms over the years since the RX-8 was discontinued. In November 2012, MX-5 program manager Nobuhiro Yamamoto indicated that Mazda was working on a 16X based RX-7, with 300 horsepower.

In October 2015, Mazda unveiled the RX-Vision concept car at the Tokyo Motor Show, powered by a new rotary engine and featured design cues reminiscent of the third generation RX-7. A production-ready concept could have followed suit by 2017, marking 50 years since the revealing of Mazda's first rotary-powered sports car, the Cosmo.
As of Mar 2023, there has been no revival of any kind.

Veilside Rx-7 
Around 800,000 Rx-7s were produced over its lifetime. Meaning that getting parts may be difficult and costly. But still there are many owners who do modify their Rx-7. A popular modification people do to their cars would be wide bodying or customizing the structure how the car looks from the outside. There are many companies who come up with new designs for wide bodying and one of them is a company Veilside. Veilside is a Japanese aftermarket automotive company for car parts. One of the most commonly recognized car from the movie series Fast and Furious's "Tokyo Drift" is Han's Veilside Rx-7. The Veilside Rx-7 is a wide body kit and can cost around 1,000 to 4,000 dollars USD. Veilside Rx-7s are  80 inches wide and 168.5 inches long compared to a regular Rx-7's 68.9 inches wide and 168.5 inches long. A Veilside Rx-7 makes 306 horsepower and 256 pound-feet of torque. Veilside Rx7 started around 1997 when the Mazda FD was first produced.

References

Citations

General sources

Further reading

External links

 

1980s cars
1990s cars
2000s cars
24 Hours of Le Mans race cars
Cars introduced in 1978
Cars powered by Wankel engines
Convertibles
Group B cars
Hatchbacks
Coupés
RX-7
RX-7
Rally cars
Rear-wheel-drive vehicles
Sports cars
Touring cars
Vehicles with four-wheel steering